Jung Yoon-sung (born June 1, 1984) is a South Korean football forward.

Career 
He formerly played for Suwon Samsung Bluewings, Gwangju Sangmu, Gyeongnam FC and Chunnam Dragons. Jung was accused of involvement in the league match-fixing scandal on 24 June 2011.

References

External links

Jung Yoon-sung Fancafe at Daum 

1984 births
Living people
South Korean footballers
Suwon Samsung Bluewings players
Gimcheon Sangmu FC players
Gyeongnam FC players
Jeonnam Dragons players
K League 1 players
Association football forwards